Scherer, Nabholz & Co. was a 19th century Russian photography company formed by Martin Scherer and Georgy Nabholz in the 1860s.

The company was known for its production of photographic postcards.

Their work is included in the collections of the Museum of Fine Arts Houston, the National Gallery of Art, Washington, the British Museum, London, the State Russian Museum and the Royal Collection Trust, London.

Gallery

References

Photography companies of Russia
Postcard publishers
Mass media companies established in the 1860s